Minister of Greenland was a cabinet post for affairs with the Danish Arctic territory.

Tom Høyem was Minister from 1982 and served till 1987 briefly (succeeded by Mimi Jakobsen).
In September 1987 the post were laid down, and responsibility transferred to the Prime ministers office.

Since 1979, Greenland has been governed locally or Home Rule with a parliament.

See also
List of Ministers for Greenland

References

Greenland